MFE - MediaForEurope N.V. (formerly Mediaset S.p.A., then Mediaset N.V.) is a Dutch-domiciled Italian-based media and communications company specialising primarily in free-to-air and pay TV production and distribution on multiple platforms, as well as in film and multimedia production and distribution, and advertising sales. It has operations in Italy, Spain and Germany. The Italian branch is Italy's leading television operator.

Its registered office is in Amsterdam, The Netherlands, while its management, operational and administrative headquarters are located in Cologno Monzese, in the Metropolitan City of Milan. Since 1994 the president of MFE is Fedele Confalonieri.

The group has been listed on the Milan Stock Exchange since 1996 and the majority shareholder is Fininvest, a holding company founded in the 1970s by Silvio Berlusconi. It is the second largest private television group in Europe after the Luxembourg-based RTL Group and the first in Italy. In terms of turnover it is among the most important in the global media market. In 2010 it was ranked the best Italian media group and fifth largest in Europe in the Thomson Reuters Extel ranking. In 2013 it was ranked the 34th largest media group in the world.

History

Beginnings in late 70s 
Mediaset's story began in 1978, with Telemilano, a local Milan-based broadcaster that became Canale 5 two years later and began broadcasting nationally. Canale 5 was subsequently joined by Italia 1 (bought from the publishing group Rusconi in 1982) and Rete 4 (acquired from Arnoldo Mondadori Editore in 1984). Television area was called RTI and became established with three national analogue networks, supported by an advertising sales company, Publitalia '80, that exclusively collects advertising for all three channels, and two other companies, Videotime, that manages TV technology and production activities, and Elettronica Industriale that guarantees signal distribution through the management of the broadcasting infrastructure. In 1987, it bought out Italian's leading home video distributor Domovideo, in a seesaw contest with Vincenzo Romangoli. In 1990, Silvio Berlusconi Communications entered into a partnership with DIC Enterprises and having SBC subsidiaries Reteitalia, S.p.A. and Telecinco to co-produce shows, a relationship that lasted until 1994.

From late 90s to early 2000: the evolution 
Branding the company under his own image and having prior experience with the cable broadcasting industry during his time in Milan, Berlusconi expanded into many media ventures such as television, film and radio industries; and in 1996, RTI, Videotime, Publitalia and Elettronica Industriale were brought together in a single group, Mediaset, which was then listed on the Milan stock exchange, opening up the company to both important institutional investors and private investors (around 300,000). In 1997, Mediaset expands outside Italy with the acquisition of a 25% stake in the Spanish broadcaster, Telecinco. In 1999, Mediaset Group expands its web-based activities with a television portal dedicated to Canale 5, Italia 1 and Retequattro and a daily online news service, is accessible from a range of media (internet, TV, radio, Mediavideo teletext and mobile phones).

In 2003, Mediaset increases its stake in Telecinco and becomes the major shareholder with 50.1% of the shares. The following year the Spanish TV company was listed on the Madrid stock exchange. In 2004, with the debut in Italy of digital terrestrial television, an innovative signal broadcasting system that uses standard aerials and a small set-top box. Mediaset launches Mediashopping, a shopping channel.

2005-2007: Pay-TV and Acquisitions 
In 2005, the group launched Mediaset Premium, a pay digital terrestrial television service which offered live Serie A football, with a pre-paid card and without a subscription. Mediaset Premium also had a pay-per-view offer including films (including first TV-screenings), theatre and live events. In 2006, Mediaset launched Europe's first digital terrestrial Mobile TV network using DVB-H (Digital Video Broadcast Handheld) technology.

In 2007, Mediaset became a major network due to its international expansion and new acquisitions. In a consortium with Cyrte Fund and Goldman Sachs, they acquired from Telefonica a controlling interest in Endemol. The Dutch production company buys Medusa, Italy's leading film production and distribution company. In 2008, they reached an agreement regarding the acquisition of Taodue.

Mediaset decides to enter the Chinese market by obtaining the licence to sell advertisements for China Global Media which in October launched the sports channel China Sport Network, a consortium of seven regional broadcasters with an audience reach of 400 million viewers. Publieurope which sells international advertising for the channel; launching a new free Italian digital terrestrial channel, Iris, featuring auteur cinema, music, literature and theatre.

2008-2009: Expansion 
In 2008, the creation of Premium Gallery, a new digital terrestrial premium content offer available with a pre-paid card. Three new channels, Joi, Mya, Steel, where viewers can see exclusive previews of the best TV series and films from Time Warner and NBC-Universal. In July, the Gallery family was joined by the Disney Channel and Premium Calcio 24 kicks off. At 2008 end, the Premium Gallery offering further improved with the launch of Premium Fantasy, including four proposals dedicated to children and teenagers. In addition to Disney Channel and Disney Channel +1, the expanded offering includes: Playhouse Disney, Cartoon Network, Hiro.

In the same year, Telecinco entered the North American market with the acquisition of a 29.2% stake in Caribevision - a US broadcaster for the country's Spanish-speaking population - while a joint venture was established between Medusa Film and Taodue, leader in the production of quality TV dramas. The union of these two companies will lead to the creation of an Italian production unit which will compete with the main international majors.

In 2009, Mediaset launched a new website.

Mediaset Premium doubled its offer of cinema with the launch of Premium Cinema and the much anticipated re-launch of Studio Universal. On 20 November Mediaset Premium launched a new feature: Premium-On-Demand, a digital library with 50 films, updated daily, and American TV series. Also 20 November Premium also launched two features dedicated to the cinema: Premium Cinema Emotion and Premium Cinema Energy.

Publitalia'80 and Mondadori Pubblicità, stipulated an agreement for the realisation of a joint initiative aiming at gathering advertising on line. On the basis of this agreement, a new company was founded on 30 July owned jointly by Mediamond.

On 31 July Mediaset sees the launch of Tivù Sat, Italy's first free digital satellite platform, built by a company jointly owned by RAI (48.25%), Mediaset (48.25%) and Telecom Italia Media (3.5%). TivùSat is a complementary platform to the existing digital terrestrial platform, and is able to reach areas of the country not covered by the terrestrial networks.

On 18 December 2009 Mediaset S.p.A., the subsidiary Telecinco and Gruppo Prisa approved and signed an agreement that foresees, conditional upon determined conditions being met, the acquisition by Telecinco of a newly founded company which will include the company part of Cuatro and its shareholding of 22% in Digital Plus.

2010 
In 2010, the title News Mediaset is operational: an internal press agency that will provide images, news and services for all of Mediaset's news structures. Two free-to-air channels were launched: La5, dedicated to a mainly female audience;  Mediaset Extra, dedicated to Mediaset channels' entertainment programmes from yesterday and today.

Mediaset Premium see the launch of Premium Cinema HD: previews of films in HD. From October, Premium will broadcast, using the on demand system films in 3D. To watch the films, viewers will need a 3D TV and a normal Premium On Demand HD decoder which, as well as providing a high definition signal, is also equipped to carry 3D.

The Comisión Nacional de la Competencia (the Spanish antitrust commission), with a resolution dated 28 October 2010, authorised the acquisition by Gestevision Telecinco S.A. of exclusive control of Sociedad General De Television Cuatro S.A.U. through the purchase of 100% of its share capital, subordinate to certain conditions. Telecinco, having met the suspension conditions to which it was subjected, today acquired a 22% stake in "DTS Distribuidora de Televisión Digital SA" ("Digital+") and 100% of the share capital of "Four Television SAU" ("Sogecuatro"), holder, among other things, of the free-to-air channel "Cuatro". This operation resulted in the Mediaset Group becoming Spain?s biggest television operator.

2011 
Mediaset launched a new service called Premium Net TV, a new non-linear "over-the-top" TV system that offers films, TV series, cartoons, documentaries, football; in addition to all of the Mediaset channels' programmes of the last seven days and the entire offer can be seen also on a PC with the same quality as on TV. Premium Net TV is a completely open, independent network system, viewable with any Gold Stamp digital decoder and a broadband connection from any telephone carrier and it is included in the standard Mediaset Premium subscription, without any additional cost.

Mediaset launched four new channels on its digital terrestrial platform: BBC Knowledge and Discovery World that broadcast documentaries; while Premium Crime dedicated to enthusiasts of thrillers and detective stories and Premium Cinema Comedy to those who love both Italian and American light comedy.

Mediaset launched new three free-to-air channels: Me, in which Mediaset will reinforce its presence in the mail order sales sector with a new brand and a new approach; TgCom24, a new, live, free-to-air, all news channel, also available online in live streaming on the TgCom24 website, and on smartphones and tablets.

In November, Italian viewers can access Premium Play, a new TV service.

2013 
Mediaset launched a new service called Infinity, a new non-linear "over-the-top" TV system that offers films, TV series, cartoons, anime; in addition to all of the Mediaset channels' programmes.

Mediaset launched a new free-to-air channel: Top Crime.

2018 
Mediaset launched a two new free-to-air channel: 20 and  Focus. Mediaset removed Mediaset HD Premium channels on 1 June 2018.

2019 
Mediaset bought Sony Pictures Television Italia's terrestrial frequences and replaced Pop and Cine Sony by Boing Plus (owned by Boing S.p.A.) and  Mediaset Extra 2, later replaced with Cine 34.

2021 
In January 2021 Mediaset signs a collaborative contract with the Romanian IT and telecommunications company DeltaLab S.A. for the construction of fiber optic network infrastructures around the world €196,000,000,000 (euro) project that will bring the high-speed line even in areas where there is no connection. the construction will take about 3 years with the help of construction companies in the various territories. When the works are finished it will be the largest infrastructure in the world, the infrastructures will be owned 30% by Mediaset and 70% by DeltaLab which will provide the connection as a direct supplier.

In November 2021, Mediaset announced a major restructuring, under which it would form a new parent company, MFE - MediaForEurope N.V., which would be domiciled in the Netherlands.

2022 
In January 2022, Mediaset closed Premium Action, Premium Crime, Premium Stories and Premium Cinema. Mediaset later bought ViacomCBS' terrestrial frequencies and launched Twentyseven 27.

Services

Free-to-air channels

Pay television channels

Radio channels

Pay TV OTT (Italy) 

 Mediaset Play Infinity

Other foreign channels 

 Nessma TV (Maghreb) 25%

Film Studio 

 Medusa Film

External broadcasting services (outside Italy) 

 Mediaset Italia

Production centres 

Milan

 TV production centre Cologno Monzese
 TV production centre Segrate

Rome

 TV production centre Palatino
 TV production centre Helios
 Drama Department - Via Aurelia Antica

Impact 
A 2019 study in The American Economic Review examined the impact of Mediaset on Italy during its rollout in the 1980s. The study compared voting habits of people who grew up in towns and regions that got early access to Mediaset against ones that only got late access to Mediaset. The study noted that Mediaset's programming, especially during the 80s & 90s, was far more slanted toward entertainment and contained far less news and educational content than its competitor, the RAI.  It also concluded that "individuals with early access to Mediaset all-entertainment content were more likely to vote for Berlusconi's party in 1994, when he first ran for office... we find that individuals exposed to entertainment TV as children were less cognitively sophisticated and civic-minded as adults, and ultimately more vulnerable to Berlusconi's populist rhetoric." The study said the effect included populist parties in general that offered simple slogans and easy cure-alls, including non-Berlusconi populist parties such as the Five Star Movement.

Lawsuits

Europa 7 
In January 2008, the European Court of Justice ruled that the TV frequencies used by Mediaset to broadcast Rete 4 were shared out unfairly. They should have been given to Europa 7, a competitor channel, the judges maintain, and Rete 4 should be broadcast via satellite instead. Although the Italian Council of State, the highest court on administrative matters, has confirmed that the Italian government should abide by this European ruling, Rete 4 continues its operation on analog frequencies and on DVB-T.

Google 
On 30 July 2008, Mediaset filed a lawsuit against Google for €500 million (US$779 million) charging copyright infringement. The company stated that 325 hours worth of material was uploaded to YouTube and the result was the loss of 315,672 viewing days and ad revenue.

Sky Italia 
On 16 September 2009, SKY Italia (fully owned by News Corporation) filed a lawsuit to the Court of Milan, Italy, against Reti Televisive Italiane and Publitalia '80 for a violation of Article 82 of European Treaty that regulates free economic competition between companies, in particular for refusing to allow SKY Italia to purchase advertising on the three main Mediaset television channels (Canale 5, Italia 1 and Rete 4), exercising Article 700 of the Italian Civil Procedural Code who permit to require an urgent action. Mediaset has rejected the charge of antitrust violations, stating that in 2009 it had broadcast SKY Italia commercials 3107 times on its channels, whereas SKY Italia has always refused to broadcast Mediaset commercials.

Key assets
 Nessman Broadcast SA (32.27%)
 Nessma SA (34.12%)
 EI Towers S.p.A. (40%)
 Towertel S.p.A. (100%)
 NetCo S.p.A. (100%)
 EIT Radio S.r.l. (100%)
 NETTROTTER S.r.l. (100%)
 Mediaset Italia S.p.A. (100%)
 Publitalia '80 S.p.A. (100%)
 Digitalia '08 S.r.l. (100%)
 Publieurope Ltd (100%)
 Beintoo S.p.A. (80%)
 Mediamond S.p.A. (50%)
 Adtech Ventures S.p.A. (50%)
 European Broadcaster Exchange (EBX) Limited (25%)
 RTI S.p.A. (100%)
 Auditel S.r.l. (26.67%)
 Elettronica Industriale S.p.A. (100%)
 RadioMediaset S.p.A. (100%)
 Radio Studio 105 S.p.A. (100%)
 RMC Italia S.p.A. (100%)
 Virgin Radio Italy S.p.A. (99.99%)
 Radio Subasio S.r.l. (100%)
 Radio Aut S.r.l. (100%)
 Medusa Film S.p.A. (100%)
 Taodue S.r.l. (100%)
 Medset Film S.a.s. (100%)
 R2 S.r.l. (100%)
 BOING S.p.A. (51%)
 Fascino Produzioni Gestione Teatro S.r.l. (50%)
 Titanus Elios S.p.A. (30%)
 tivù S.r.l. (48.16%)
 Studio 71 Italia S.r.l. (49%)
 Superguida TV S.r.l. (49%)
 Mediaset Investment N.V. (100%)
 Mediaset España Comunicación S.A. (53.26%)
 ProSiebenSat.1 Media SE (9.75%)
 Publiespaña SAU (100%)
 Publimedia Gestión SAU (100%)
 NETSONIC SL (100%)
 ANINPRO CREATIVE SL (51%)
 Aunia Publicidad Interactiva SLU (50%)
 Adtech Ventures S.p.A. (50%)
 European Broadcaster Exchange (EBX) Limited (25%)
 Grupo Audiovisual Mediaset España Comunicación SAU (100%)
 CONNECTA 5 TELECINCO SAU (100%)
 Mediacinco Cartera SL (100%)
 Grupo Editorial Tele 5 SAU (100%)
 Advertisement for Adventures, SLU (100%)
 Producción y Distribucción de Contenidos Audiovisuales Mediterraneo, SLU (100%)
 Telecinco Cinema SAU (100%)
 Furia de Titanes II A.I.E. (34%)
 MegaMedia Televisión SL (65%)
 Supersport Televisión SL (62.5%)
 Buldog TV Spain SL (30%)
 El Desmarque Portal Deportivo SL (60%)
 La Fabrica De La Tele SL (30%)
 Unicorn Content SL (30%)
 Producciones Mandarina SL (30%)
 Campanilla Films SL (100%)
 Melodia Producciones SL (40%)
 Alea Media SA (40%)
 Fenix Media Audiovisual SL (40%)

See also 

 TGCOM,  an Italian news website owned by Mediaset
 Television in Italy

References

External links

 

 
1996 initial public offerings
Mass media companies of Italy
Italian-language television networks
Mass media in Milan
Mass media companies established in 1993
Italian companies established in 1993
European Broadcasting Union members
Fininvest
Silvio Berlusconi
Italian brands